Cwmavon Glam railway station served the village of Cwmafan, in the historical county of Glamorganshire, Wales, from 1885 to 1964 on the Rhondda and Swansea Bay Railway.

History 
The station was opened on 25 June 1885 by the Rhondda and Swansea Bay Railway. It was also known as Cwm Avon in the timetables and tickets until 1904. The station closed to passengers on 3 December 1962 and closed to goods on 2 November 1964.

References

External links 

Disused railway stations in Neath Port Talbot
Railway stations in Great Britain opened in 1885
Railway stations in Great Britain closed in 1962
1885 establishments in Wales
1964 disestablishments in Wales